The boys' sprint classical cross-country skiing competition at the 2016 Winter Youth Olympics was held on 16 February at the Birkebeineren Ski Stadium. The sprint distance was 1.3km.

Results

Qualifying

Quarterfinals
Quarterfinal 1

Quarterfinal 2

Quarterfinal 3

Quarterfinal 4

Quarterfinal 5

Semifinals
Semifinal 1

Semifinal 2

Final

References

External links
Qualification results
Bracket

Cross-country skiing at the 2016 Winter Youth Olympics